The Democratic Socialist Organizing Committee (DSOC) was a democratic socialist organization in the United States.

The DSOC was founded in 1973 by Michael Harrington, who had led a minority caucus in the Socialist Party of America and disagreed with its transformation into Social Democrats, USA. Harrington's caucus supported George McGovern's call for a cease-fire and immediate withdrawal from Vietnam. In contrast to the traditional emphasis on strengthening the working class by organizing labor unions, Harrington reduced the emphasis on labor of previous socialist organizations. While continuing to work with unionists, Harrington instead placed more emphasis on middle-class political activists, especially those drawn to activism through the McGovern campaign. Developing a "realignment" strategy common to socialists since the 1960s, the DSOC tried to help to build a "democratic left" movement from the political movements participating in the Democratic Party.

In 1982, the DSOC merged with the New American Movement to form the Democratic Socialists of America.

History

Origins 

After nearly a decade of internal acrimony, the Socialist Party of America-Social Democratic Federation was clearly headed for a split as the decade of the 1970s opened. While sharing a common antipathy to the worldwide Communist movement, the organization was divided over two primary issues:
 Should democratic socialists call for either an immediate withdrawal of United States forces from Vietnam or a negotiated peace settlement along with an immediate end to the bombing of North Vietnam?
 Should the democratic left continue its traditional focus of organizing the working class in labor unions or should it shift its focus to (predominantly middle class) peace activists?

1972 Convention of the Socialist Party of America 

In its 1972 convention, the Socialist Party of America (SPA) had two Co-Chairmen, Bayard Rustin and Charles S. Zimmerman of the International Ladies' Garment Workers' Union (ILGWU); and a First National Vice Chairman, James S. Glaser, who were re-elected by acclamation. In his opening speech to the convention, Co-Chairman Bayard Rustin called for Social Democrats, USA (SDUSA) to organize against the "reactionary policies of the Nixon Administration" while at the same time criticized the "irresponsibility and élitism of the 'New Politics' liberals".

The party changed its name to SDUSA by a vote of 73 to 34. Renaming the party as SDUSA was meant to be "realistic". The New York Times observed that the SPA had last sponsored a candidate for President in 1956, who received only 2,121 votes, which were cast in only 6 states. Because the party no longer sponsored candidates in presidential elections, the name "Party" had been "misleading" as "Party" had hindered the recruiting of activists who participated in the Democratic Party, according to the majority report. The name "Socialist" was replaced by "Social Democrats" because many American associated the word "socialism" with Soviet Communism. The party also wished to distinguish itself from two small Marxist parties, the Socialist Workers Party and the Socialist Labor Party.

During the convention, the majority (Unity Caucus) won every vote by a ratio of two to one. The convention elected a national committee of 33 members, with 22 seats for the majority caucus, eight seats for the Coalition Caucus of Michael Harrington, two for a Debs Caucus and one for the independent Samuel H. Friedman. Friedman and the minority caucuses had opposed the name change.

The convention voted on and adopted proposals for its program by a two-one vote. On foreign policy, the program called for "firmness toward Communist aggression". However, on the Vietnam War the program opposed "any efforts to bomb Hanoi into submission" and instead it endorsed negotiating a peace agreement, which should protect Communist political cadres in South Vietnam from further military or police reprisals. Harrington's proposal for a ceasefire and immediate withdrawal of United States forces was defeated. Harrington complained that after its convention the Socialist Party had endorsed George McGovern only with a  statement loaded with "constructive criticism" and that it had not mobilized enough support for McGovern. The majority caucus's Arch Puddington replied that the California branch was especially active in supporting McGovern while the New York branch were focusing on a congressional race.

Foundation 

Even before the convention, Michael Harrington had resigned as an Honorary Chairperson of the SPA. Some months after the convention, he resigned his membership in SDUSA. Harrington and his supporters from the Coalition Caucus soon formed the DSOC. Many members of the Debs Caucus resigned from SDUSA and formed the Socialist Party USA. Despite opposing the majority of the SPA, Harrington acknowledged the validity of its members' concerns: The anti-war activists of the sixties were overwhelmingly white and middle class. Many of them were unconcerned about the domestic political consequences of their actions and were even contemptuous of that majority of Americans who supported the war. There was a profoundly elitist tendency in the movement that [the majority of the Socialist Party leadership] denounced as dilettantish and collegiate. Moreover, there was a vocal, and regularly televised, fringe of confrontationists, exhibitionists, and Vietcong flag wavers who could plausibly be dismissed as freakish, or sinister, or both.

Harrington's caucus in the SPA endorsed the New Politics movement and sought to expand that tendency into a viable left-wing pressure-group within the Democratic Party, advancing an explicitly socialist agenda and attempting to win influence over elected officials for that program. Harrington led many members of this caucus and from his networks to establish the DSOC in 1973.

Harrington, a former editor of the SPA's weekly newspaper, New America, was the most important figure in the establishment of DSOC. Harrington had resigned as National Co-Chairman of the SPA, many of whose leaders criticized McGovern, when Harrington focused his efforts on electing McGovern in October 1972.

In his first memoir, published in 1973, Harrington defended his choice of peace activists over trade unionists: But in their derogatory comparison of this movement with the trade unionists, my comrades failed to notice two of its historic aspects. First, the anti-war young were right: Vietnam was not only an immoral conflict, it was counterproductive from all points of view, including that of progressive anti-Communism. Secondly, the new strata of the issue-oriented and college-educated who provided the mass bass for this phenomenon were, and are, extremely important to the creation of a new majority for change in this country.

At its start, the DSOC had 840 members, of which 2 percent served on its national board; approximately 200 had previously had membership in the SDUSA or its predecessors in 1973 when SDUSA stated its membership at 1,800, according to a 1973 profile of Harrington.

Publications 
The publication that would eventually become the official organ of the DSOC, initially an eight-page letter-sized monthly called Newsletter of the Democratic Left, predated the formal establishment of the DSOC as a national organization in October 1973. The first issue of Newsletter of the Democratic Left (the name was later shortened to Democratic Left) appeared in March 1973 under the editorship of Mike Harrington, assisted by Jack Clark as Managing Editor.<ref name="DL001">[http://www.marxisthistory.org/history/usa/parties/dsa/1973/0300-dsoc-dl001.pdf Newsletter of the Democratic Left], vol. 1, no. 1 (March 1973).</ref> A front page essay by Harrington, entitled "The Shape of Our Politics", made nary a mention of the bitter faction fight within the SPA: Liberalism is in transition. Important ideologists announce their 'deradicalization.'

On the other wing, many trade unionists and middle-class liberals have become aware of the need for structural change in our society. In the McGovern campaign, for instance, the frankly redistributionist principle that revenue should be raised by levies on unearned incomes was a major step forward.

On the campus there is a decline of activism, a revival of private concerns. The New Left is dead. But a large and serious constituency of the Left remains, even if unorganized and uncertain. If presented with a clear and reasoned perspective for basic change, it might be won to a lifetime commitment, even in the Nixon years; if not, it could vanish.

The Left, more than ever before, needs thought, self-criticism, candor, and communication. We hope this Newsletter will make a modest contribution to that end.Democratic Left continues today as the publication of the Democratic Socialists of America, the organizational successor to the DSOC. The organization also published a number of issues of an internal discussion bulletin, containing typewritten content submitted by its members about various issues of concern.

 Formal establishment 
The June 1973 issue of Newsletter of the Democratic Left,'' the fourth monthly magazine off the press, announced to its subscribers that the never-before-mentioned National Board of the DSOC had issued a call for the launch of "a new, nationwide socialist organization". The founding convention of the DSOC was initially slated to begin on October 12, 1973 in New York City. For the first time, membership dues were solicited, with rates of $3.50 for students and $7.00 for regular membership accepted until January 1, 1974.

The Founding Convention was to be a three-day-long affair, beginning at 8 pm at the Eisner and Lubin Auditorium of New York University. The convention was not composed of elected delegates, but was rather open to a general admission and about 500 people were in attendance. The keynote speaker chosen by the organizers of the DSOC to address this gathering was David Lewis, one of the key architects of the New Democratic Party, the social-democratic parliamentary opposition party of Canada.

The following day on October 13, the convention moved to the McAlpin Hotel, located at the corner of Broadway and 34th Street in New York City and began in earnest. Harrington delivered an address to those attending the gathering which was undelegated and open to all desiring to attend from the general public and then the attendees broke up into various small workshops. Small group subjects included "the unions", "feminism", "racial equality", "Democratic Party", "equality" and "detente". Workshop chairs were appointed in advance and included Michael Walzer, Bogdan Denitch, Christopher Lasch and others. A panel discussion on "Socialism and the Welfare State" was also held, featuring prominently Harrington's close political associate, the historian and magazine editor Irving Howe, an individual who would become one of the organization's leading faces.

The final day saw the election of a governing National Board and ratification of a constitution for the new organization.

Membership size and structure 
According to the group's founder Michael Harrington, the DSOC began with a core of about 250 members. The group's first paid staffer was Jack Clark, a 23-year-old from Boston who received $50 a month and use of a spare bed in the home of Debbie Meier, herself a second generation socialist and important figure in the DSOC inner circle. Meier's home served as the group's base of operations up to the October 1973 convention, at which time the DSOC rented a tiny basement office.

Ideology and strategy 
The DSOC presented itself as an explicitly socialist organization. In electoral politics, it worked within the Democratic Party in which it dedicated itself to building a base of support for democratic-socialist ("democratic-left") ideas. In Michael Harrington's view, the task facing the American movement was "to build a new American majority for social change". While important, Harrington wrote that the union movement could not win political power in its own right, instead arguing that it needed to unite with the "college-educated and issue-oriented" adherents of the so-called "New Politics" in the Democratic Party: In 1968, the Center-Right of Nixon and Wallace received almost 58% of the votes; in 1972, in a two-way race, Nixon got over 61%. In 1968, the American unions were a major, and sometimes sole, force behind Hubert Humphrey, proving that the organized workers are the most cohesive element that can be mobilized for social change. But the '68 election also proved that labor by itself cannot come close to winning. [...] In 1968 many McCarthyites did not understand that Humphrey was infinitely preferable to Nixon; in 1972, the Meanyites did not understand that McGovern was infinitely preferable to Nixon.

If this split continues, the Republicans will hold the Presidency for the foreseeable future. Therefore, the only way to build a new majority for social change is for labor and the new politics to come together.

The DSOC proposed  winning power through the tactic of "realignment", i.e. uniting of forces within the Democratic Party on a democratic socialist platform.

Its members ran for political office almost always within the Democratic Party. In addition, the DSOC publicized and promoted the individual efforts of its dues payers and supporters, many of whom were active in labor unions or other political organizations. There were members of the DSOC who were elected to the Congress (Berkeley, California Rep. Ron Dellums) and the New York City Council (Ruth Messinger). The DSOC had public support from union leaders as Victor Reuther of the United Auto Workers, William W. Winpisinger of the International Association of Machinists and various officials of the Amalgamated Clothing Workers of America.

Democratic Socialists of America 
The DSOC ceased to exist in 1982 when it merged with the New American Movement (NAM) to form the Democratic Socialists of America (DSA).

Discussions with representatives of the NAM, a successor organization to Students for a Democratic Society, began as early as 1977. The move was favored by the DSOC's left-wing led by historian Jim Chapin which sought to bring into the DSOC many former participants in the New Left of the 1960s who were in search of a new home. The DSOC formally endorsed the idea of merger with the NAM at its 1979 Houston convention.

However, the proposal for merger generated vocal opposition. Forces on the organization's right-wing, led by Howe and calling themselves the Committee Against the NAM Merger (CATNAM), urged that instead of courting New Left survivors. the DSOC should instead continue to place its emphasis on outreach to larger forces in the labor movement and the Democratic Party. In addition to noting the NAM's deep distrust of the Democratic Party, many adherents of the CATNAM had grave misgivings about the NAM's position towards Israel, with the DSOC maintaining belief in a two-state solution guaranteeing the existence of Israel while many in the NAM saw the Palestine Liberation Organization as engaged in an anti-colonial liberation struggle. Ultimately, a careful statement was worked out on the Middle East based upon a two-state solution and merger talks moved forward.

The 1981 DSOC National Convention was marked by a very heated debate on the question of merger with the NAM, which was ultimately resolved by a vote of approximately 80% of the delegates in favor and none against, with the 20% or so supporting the CATNAM position abstaining. Harrington later noted: "Our opponents wanted to indicate they were unhappy — and that they were staying".

The unity convention joining the NAM and the DSOC was held in Detroit in 1982 and the DSA was thereby established. The gathering was addressed by George Crockett, a member of the Congressional Black Caucus in the House of Representatives, with Harrington delivering the keynote address. The new organization claimed a membership of 6,000 at the time of its formation.

Footnotes

Further reading 
 Newsletter of the Democratic Left. First ten issues. New York. Democratic Socialist Organizing Committee. 1973.
 We are Socialists of the Democratic Left. Fifth Anniversary edition. New York. Democratic Socialist Organizing Committee. 1982.
 Social Democrats, USA. For the Record: The Report by the Social Democrats, USA on the Resignation of Michael Harrington and his Attempt to Split the American Socialist Movement. New York. Social Democrats, USA. n.d. [1973]. Polemic against Michael Harrington from the time of the 1973 Socialist Party of America split.

External links 
  Democratic Socialists of America official website. DSAUSA.org, successor organization to the DSOC.

Defunct democratic socialist organizations in the United States
Defunct social democratic organizations in the United States
Political parties established in 1973
Political parties disestablished in 1982
Political advocacy groups in the United States
New Left
DSOC
Socialist Party of America